Brian Broomell (born June 26, 1958) is a former American football quarterback who played one season with the Edmonton Eskimos of the Canadian Football League (CFL). He played college football at Temple University and attended Sterling High School in Somerdale, New Jersey. He was also a member of the Los Angeles Express of the United States Football League (USFL).

College career
Broomell played for the Temple Owls from 1976 to 1979. He was a defensive back his freshman year in 1976 before converting to quarterback in 1977. He recorded career totals of 3,902 yards on 35 passing touchdowns. He helped the Owls to a 28-17 victory over the California Golden Bears in the 1979 Garden State Bowl on December 15, 1979. Broomell was inducted into the Temple University Athletics Hall of Fame in 1997.

Professional career
Broomell was a member of the Edmonton Eskimos of the CFL from 1980 to 1981, winning the Grey Cup both years. He signed with the USFL's Los Angeles Express in 1983. He was placed on the team's developmental roster and later released on May 26, 1983.

References

External links
Just Sports Stats
College stats

Living people
1958 births
Players of American football from New Jersey
American football quarterbacks
Canadian football quarterbacks
American players of Canadian football
Temple Owls football players
Edmonton Elks players
Los Angeles Express players
Sportspeople from Camden County, New Jersey